Empress Ju (沮皇后, personal name unknown) was the wife and empress of Liu Wuzhou, who rebelled against the rule of the Chinese Sui Dynasty near its end, taking imperial style himself.

Very little is known about Empress Ju—all that is clear is that after Liu took imperial title—either khan or tianzi—in 617, he created her empress. It is not known whether she survived to his subsequent defeat in 620 at the hand of the Tang Dynasty general Li Shimin, or his death, putatively in 622. (The below chart assumed that she survived to at least 620.)

Sui dynasty people
Tang dynasty people
Chinese empresses